Kotha Bangaru Lokam is a 2008 Indian Telugu-language romantic drama film directed by debutant Srikanth Addala, and produced by Dil Raju. The film stars Varun Sandesh and Shweta Basu Prasad with Prakash Raj, Jayasudha, Brahmanandam, and Rao Ramesh in supporting roles. The film has music composed by Mickey J. Meyer and cinematography by Chota K. Naidu.

The film released on 9 October 2008. The film received two Nandi Awards and five Filmfare Awards South.

Plot
Balu is the only son of a humble middle-class couple. Swapna is the daughter of a strict and rich couple. Both of them study in a residential college located at Visakhapatnam.

They soon fall for each other but question their relationship, whether it's attraction or love. Swapna is taken away from the college after a picture of them gets published in the newspaper. Balu is asked to bring his father lest he should not write exams. He goes home and tells his parents a completely different story. While his parents keep thinking that he is studying for his exam, he is busy daydreaming about Swapna and looking for her. At last, he brings his father to the college, not to write the exam but to see Swapna. His father is clueless about what is happening and still believes Balu.

Balu meets Swapna and her parents. Swapna's parents arrange another marriage for her. Balu's father learns of his behaviour from his friend. Though disappointed, he believes that children should be dealt with love and not fear. While leaving on a train, Balu's father dies in an accident. On the same day, Swapna runs away from her house to live with Balu, but Balu doesn't show up because of his father's death. Balu thinks that Swapna is with her father and her father thinks that she is with Balu. Four years later, they both miss each other. Balu and Swapna's father meet at a railroad station. Balu gets to know that swapna was not with her father and Swapna's father that she is not with balu. Balu's mother reaches and tells Balu that she had Swapna with one of his lecturers who helped him realize the meaning of life. She kept them away from each other so they realize what life means and also that patience comes from true love only. Now that they are mature enough, none can stop them. Swapna and Balu reunite, also they reunite with her father.

Cast

Soundtrack

The soundtrack of the film was released on 23 August 2008. It had music scored by composer, Mickey J Meyer. The music was launched on the evening of 23 August 2008 at State Art Gallery, Hyderabad by Jr. NTR, Prabhas and Allu Arjun.

Release 
The film was dubbed into Malayalam with the title Ithu Njangalude Lokam and Hindi as Pavitra Bandhan in 2013 by Goldmines Telefilms. The Television rights of the film was sold to Zee Telugu.

The film was remade in Kannada as Cheluvina Chilipili (2009) by S. Narayan  starring Pankaj and Roopika, and in Bengali as Tor Naam by Jaya Sankar starring Gaurav Bajaj and Swathi Deekshith.

Reception
Rediff.com critic Radhika Rajamani rated the film 3 stars out of 5 and opined that Addala has written an interesting screenplay for a routine storyline. On performances, she wrote: "Varun Sandesh and Shwetha Prasad wow with their liveliness, energy and their teenage innocence. Both are sprightly and full of joie de vivre, necessary for the role as teenage students and are the right choice for the roles."

Idlebrain.com, which rated the film 4/5, stated: "The debutant director Srikanth Addala comes up with a script that offers lot of freshness."

Accolades

Notes

References

External links
 

2008 films
Telugu films remade in other languages
Films directed by Srikanth Addala
Films scored by Mickey J Meyer
2008 directorial debut films
2000s Telugu-language films
2008 romantic comedy-drama films
Indian romantic comedy-drama films
Films set in Andhra Pradesh
Films shot in Andhra Pradesh
Films shot in Rajahmundry
Films set in Rajahmundry
Sri Venkateswara Creations films
Films shot in Thrissur